Martin Hume Johnson (born 1944)  is emeritus professor of Reproductive Sciences in the Department of Physiology, Development and Neuroscience (PDN) at the University of Cambridge.

Education
Johnson was educated at Cheltenham Grammar School for Boys and Christ's College, Cambridge, where he was awarded Master of Arts and Doctor of Philosophy degrees in 1969 for immunochemical analysis of factors affecting fertility.

Research
Currently, Johnson's research investigates the history of the reproductive and developmental sciences and their historical relationship to the development of human In vitro fertilisation and other clinical technologies, and to their regulation legally and ethically. Johnson collaborates with Kay Elder, at the Bourn Hall Clinic, Sarah Franklin and Nick Hopwood in the Department of History and Philosophy of Science, University of Cambridge.

Johnson has co-authored over 300 papers on reproductive and developmental science, history, ethics, law and medical education. Johnson is the co-editor of Essential Reproduction (now in its eighth edition), Sexuality Repositioned: diversity and the law, Death Rites and Rights and Birth Rites and Rights.

Johnson's research has been funded by the Wellcome Trust.

Awards and honours
Johnson was elected a Fellow of the Royal Society (FRS) in 2014. His nomination reads: 

Johnson was elected a Fellow of the Academy of Medical Sciences (FMedSci) in 2012. His nomination reads: 

Johnson is also a Fellow of the Royal College of Obstetricians and Gynaecologists (FRCOG) and a Fellow of the Royal Society of Biology (FRSB).

Having been, with Richard Gardner, Bob Edwards' first graduate student (1966–1969), Prof Johnson opened the Nobel Symposium on Bob's work in Stockholm, 2010.

References

Living people
Fellows of the Royal College of Obstetricians and Gynaecologists
Fellows of the Royal Society
Fellows of the Royal Society of Biology
Fellows of Christ's College, Cambridge
1944 births